Monique Vinh Thuy (born Monique Baudot, 30 April 1946 – 27 September 2021) was the widow of the last Emperor of Vietnam, Bảo Đại.

Biography
In 1969, Monique Baudot, a French citizen who was then working in the press department of the Democratic Republic of the Congo's embassy in France, met Emperor Bảo Đại in Paris. The former Vietnamese monarch abdicated in 1945, a year later went to live overseas, returned to Vietnam in 1949 as Head of State of Vietnam, but was overthrown by his Prime Minister Ngo Dinh Diem in 1955. He lived in exile in France thereafter.

In Paris around 1971, the former emperor and Baudot started to live together. They married in 1982.

Since the death of her husband in 1997, Baudot has self-styled as Her Very Gracious Majesty Empress Thái Phương.

According to French media, she died on September 27, 2021, at the age of 75. Her funeral was held on October 14, 2021 at the Chapel Sainte-Bernadette d'Auteuil in Paris.

References

External links
Emperor Bảo Đại and Princess Vĩnh Thụy visit Thiên-Lý Bửu-Tòa Cao Dai Temple Dec. 2, 1982 at San Martin, California
Princess Vĩnh Thụy Interview English
Emperor Bảo Đại and Princess Vĩnh Thụy meet supporters in France French

Vietnamese princesses
French diplomats
1946 births
2021 deaths
Princesses by marriage